Bacchisa gigantea is a species of beetle in the family Cerambycidae. It was described by Breuning in 1959. It is known from Java. Its common name is the Bacharach's Giant Beetle, and is known for eating lichen and tree bark. It is mostly solitary, and is capable of flying up to 20 km in a single day. It lives mainly in rainforests but travels to the Tibetan plateaus to mate every 5–7 years. It has one of the longest lifespans among beetles of about 20 years.

References

G
Beetles described in 1959